Bellamya contracta is a species of large freshwater snail with a gill and an operculum, an aquatic gastropod mollusc in the family Viviparidae.

This species is endemic to the Democratic Republic of the Congo.

References

Viviparidae
Invertebrates of the Democratic Republic of the Congo
Endemic fauna of the Democratic Republic of the Congo
Freshwater snails of Africa
Taxonomy articles created by Polbot